Flikken (Belgian Dutch for "Cops") was a popular Flemish-Belgian TV series about a police-department located in Ghent. The show started in 1999 and ended on 19 April 2009. In the series, a team of six police officers solved various crimes, petty crimes as well as organised crime. The series always aimed at showing the policework in a realistic way—though a little personal drama was never far off.
Of all the actors that came along during the ten seasons, only Mark Tijsmans (playing Wilfried Pasmans) and Ludo Hellinx (playing Raymond Jacobs) appeared throughout the entire series.

Flikken was produced by the VRT and broadcast on Belgian public channel Eén and TROS in the Netherlands. 
Flikken is very popular in Belgium and the Netherlands. The show has had very high ratings of up to 1.8 million viewers during the last (10th) season.

Every year the VRT organises the Flikkendag, a family day where the public can meet the actors of the show. There are many games, demonstrations of the real police and other safety organisations and performances of singers (including some of the actors on the show).
On 18 April 2009, a special farewell party was organised in Ghent, in which the actors and crew said goodbye to their fans - thousands had assembled to watch the show on stage.

In the Netherlands a spin-off Flikken Maastricht has had nine seasons so far. A second spin-off,  called Flikken Rotterdam, is upcoming for 2016.

Media adaptations

In 2005 a video game came out based on the series, Flikken game - De Achtervolging. It received bad reviews for its "unflashy" style.

A second video game, Flikken Game 2: Moord in Hotel Ganda, was release in 2007. The game is a localised version of the 2006 Swedish game Dollar, written by crime writer Liza Marklund. 

In 2010 the TV series was adapted into an action comic, written by Zaki Dewaele and drawn by Michaël Vincent.

Episode

Cast

Main

Recurring

References

External links

 een.be

Flemish television shows
Belgian crime television series
Belgian drama television shows
Television shows set in Belgium
1999 Belgian television series debuts
2009 Belgian television series endings
Television shows adapted into comics
Television shows adapted into video games
1990s Belgian television series
2000s Belgian television series
Ghent in fiction
Eén original programming
NPO 1 original programming